Lawrence Dundas, 1st Earl of Zetland (10 April 1766 – 19 February 1839) was a Scottish MP who sat in the House of Commons from 1790 to 1820 when he was raised to the peerage.

Early life 
Dundas was the son of Thomas Dundas, 1st Baron Dundas and was born in Westminster on 10 April 1766. He was educated at Harrow and was admitted at Trinity College, Cambridge. He married Harriot Hale, one of the twenty-one children of General John Hale and his wife Mary Chaloner, by whom he had three sons and four daughters.

Political career
Dundas was elected Whig Member of Parliament for Richmond, North Yorkshire in 1790. Twelve years later he exchanged this seat for that of York, and in 1808 returned to Westminster as representative for his old Richmond seat. In 1811 he was again elected MP for York, and became Lord Mayor of the city that same year, having been an alderman since 1808. He was Lord Mayor a second time in 1821.

In 1820 Dundas succeeded his father as second Baron Dundas and as a baronet. He was appointed Lord Lieutenant of Orkney and Shetland in 1831, and in 1838, on the occasion of the coronation of Queen Victoria, he was created Earl of Zetland (i.e. Shetland) for having provided financial assistance to the new Queen's parents, the Duke & Duchess of Kent, in the years preceding her accession.

Slave holder
According to the Legacies of British Slave-Ownership at the University College London, Zetland was awarded compensation in the aftermath of the Slavery Abolition Act 1833 with the Slave Compensation Act 1837. 

Zetland was associated with "T71/880 Grenada claim no. 604 (Dougalston Estate)" and "T71/881 Dominica claim no. 576A & B (Castle Bruce)", he owned 351 slaves in Grenada and Dominica and received a £8,135 payment at the time (worth £ in ).

Later life and legacy
Dundas's wife died in 1834. He died suddenly on 19 February 1839 at his home of Aske Hall, Yorkshire. He was succeeded by his eldest son Thomas Dundas, 2nd Earl of Zetland.

He is buried in the family vault at Trinity Church in central Falkirk.

References

External links

Zetland Estates

|-

Zetland, Lawrence Dundas, 1st Earl of
Zetland, Lawrence Dundas, 1st Earl of
Zetland, Lawrence Dundas, 1st Earl of
Zetland, Lawrence Dundas 
Zetland, Lawrence Dundas, 1st Earl of
Zetland, Lawrence Dundas, 1st Earl of
Zetland, Lawrence Dundas, 1st Earl of
Zetland, Lawrence Dundas, 1st Earl of
Zetland, Lawrence Dundas, 1st Earl of
Members of the Parliament of Great Britain for English constituencies
British MPs 1790–1796
British MPs 1796–1800
Members of the Parliament of the United Kingdom for English constituencies
UK MPs 1801–1802
UK MPs 1802–1806
UK MPs 1806–1807
UK MPs 1807–1812
UK MPs 1812–1818
UK MPs 1818–1820
Zetland, E1
UK MPs who were granted peerages
Zetland, Lawrence Dundas, 1st Earl of
Lord Mayors of York
Clan Dundas
Recipients of payments from the Slavery Abolition Act 1833
Scottish slave owners
Peers of the United Kingdom created by Queen Victoria